Květinov is a municipality and village in Havlíčkův Brod District in the Vysočina Region of the Czech Republic. It has about 200 inhabitants.

Administrative parts
Villages of Kvasetice and Radňov are administrative parts of Květinov.

References

Villages in Havlíčkův Brod District